Chlamydia trachomatis, commonly known as chlamydia, is a bacterium that causes chlamydia, which can manifest in various ways, including: trachoma, lymphogranuloma venereum, nongonococcal urethritis, cervicitis, salpingitis, pelvic inflammatory disease. C. trachomatis is the most common infectious cause of blindness and the most common sexually transmitted bacterium.

Different types of C. trachomatis cause different diseases. The most common strains cause disease in the genital tract, while other strains cause disease in the eye or lymph nodes. Like other Chlamydia species, the C. trachomatis life cycle consists of two morphologically distinct life stages: elementary bodies and reticulate bodies. Elementary bodies are spore-like and infectious, whereas reticulate bodies are in the replicative stage and are seen only within host cells.

Description
Chlamydia trachomatis is a gram-negative bacterium that can replicate only within a host cell. Over the course of the C. trachomatis life cycle, the bacteria take on two distinct forms. Elementary bodies are 200 to 400 nanometers across, and are surrounded by a rigid cell wall that allows them to survive outside of a host cell. This form can initiate a new infection if it comes into contact with a susceptible host cell. Reticulate bodies are 600 to 1500 nanometers across, and are found only within host cells. Neither form is motile.

The C. trachomatis genome is substantially smaller than that of many other bacteria at approximately 1.04 megabases, encoding approximately 900 genes. Several important metabolic functions are not encoded in the C. trachomatis genome, and instead, are likely scavenged from the host cell. In addition to the chromosome that contains most of the genome, nearly all C. trachomatis strains carry a 7.5 kilobase plasmid that contains 8 genes. The role of this plasmid is unknown, though strains without the plasmid have been isolated, suggesting it is not required for survival of the bacterium.

Life cycle

Like other Chlamydia species, C. trachomatis has a life cycle consisting of two morphologically distinct forms. First, C. trachomatis attaches to a new host cell as a small spore-like form called the elementary body. The elementary body enters the host cell, surrounded by a host vacuole, called an inclusion. Within the inclusion, C. trachomatis transforms into a larger, more metabolically active form called the reticulate body. The reticulate body substantially modifies the inclusion, making it a more hospitable environment for rapid replication of the bacteria, which occurs over the following 30 to 72 hours. The massive number of intracellular bacteria then transition back to resistant elementary bodies, before causing the cell to rupture and being released into the environment. These new elementary bodies are then shed in the semen or released from epithelial cells of the female genital tract, and attach to new host cells.

Classification
C. trachomatis are bacteria in the genus Chlamydia, a group of obligate intracellular parasites of eukaryotic cells. Chlamydial cells cannot carry out energy metabolism and they lack biosynthetic pathways.

C. trachomatis strains are generally divided into three biovars based on the type of disease they cause. These are further subdivided into several serovars based on the surface antigens recognized by the immune system. Serovars A through C cause trachoma, which is the world's leading cause of preventable infectious blindness. Serovars D through K infect the genital tract, causing pelvic inflammatory disease, ectopic pregnancies, and infertility. Serovars L1 through L3 cause an invasive infection of the lymph nodes near the genitals, called lymphogranuloma venereum.

C. trachomatis is thought to have diverged from other Chlamydia species around 6 million years ago. This genus contains a total of nine species: C. trachomatis, C. muridarum, C. pneumoniae, C. pecorum, C. suis, C. abortus, C. felis, C. caviae, and C. psittaci. The closest relative to C. trachomatis is C. muridarum, which infects mice. C. trachomatis along with C. pneumoniae have been found to infect humans to a greater extent. C. trachomatis exclusively infects humans. C. pneumoniae is found to also infect horses, marsupials, and frogs. Some of the other species can have a considerable impact on human health due to their known zoonotic transmission.

Role in disease

Clinical signs and symptoms of C. trachomatis infection in the genitalia present as the chlamydia infection, which may be asymptomatic or may resemble a gonorrhea infection.
Both are common causes of multiple other conditions including pelvic inflammatory disease and urethritis.

C. trachomatis is the single most important infectious agent associated with blindness (trachoma), and it also affects the eyes in the form of inclusion conjunctivitis and is responsible for about 19% of adult cases of conjunctivitis.

C. trachomatis in the lungs presents as the chlamydia pneumoniae respiratory infection and can affect all ages.

Pathogenesis
Elementary bodies are generally present in the semen of infected men and vaginal secretions of infected women. When they come into contact with a new host cell, the elementary bodies bind to the cell via interaction between adhesins on their surface and several host receptor proteins and heparan sulfate proteoglycans. Once attached, the bacteria inject various effector proteins into the host cell using a type three secretion system. These effectors trigger the host cell to take up the elementary bodies and prevent the cell from triggering apoptosis. Within 6 to 8 hours after infection, the elementary bodies transition to reticulate bodies and a number of new effectors are synthesized. These effectors include a number of proteins that modify the inclusion membrane, called Inc proteins, as well as proteins that redirect host vesicles to the inclusion. 8 to 16 hours after infection, another set of effectors are synthesized, driving acquisition of nutrients from the host cell. At this stage, the reticulate bodies begin to divide, coinciding with the expansion of the inclusion. If several elementary bodies have infected a single cell, their inclusions will fuse at this point to create a single large inclusion in the host cell. From 24 to 72 hours after infection, reticulate bodies transition to elementary bodies which are released either by lysis of the host cell or extrusion of the entire inclusion into the host genital tract.

Presentation
Most people infected with C. trachomatis are asymptomatic. However, the bacteria can present in one of three ways: genitourinary (genitals), pulmonary (lungs), and ocular (eyes).

Genitourinary cases can include genital discharge, vaginal bleeding, itchiness (pruritus), painful urination (dysuria), among other symptoms. Often, symptoms are similar to those of a urinary tract infection.

When C. trachomatis presents in the eye in the form of trachoma it begins by gradually thickening the eyelids, and eventually begins to pull the eyelashes into the eyelid. In the form of inclusion conjunctivitis the infection presents with redness, swelling, mucopurulent discharge from the eye, and most other symptoms associated with adult conjunctivitis.

When C. trachomatis is in the lungs in the form of a respiratory infection it typically has symptoms of a runny or stuffy nose, low-grade fever, hoarseness of voice, as well as other symptoms associated with general pneumonia.

C. trachomatis may latently infect the chorionic villi tissues of pregnant women, thereby impacting pregnancy outcome.

Prevalence
Three times as many women are diagnosed with genitourinary C. trachomatis infections as men. Women aged 15–19 have the highest prevalence, followed by women aged 20–24, although the rate of increase of diagnosis is greater for men than for women. Risk factors for genitourinary infections include unprotected sex with multiple partners, lack of condom use, and low socioeconomic status living in urban areas.

Pulmonary infections can occur in infants born to women with active chlamydia infections, although the rate of infection is less than 10%.

Ocular infections take the form of inclusion conjunctivitis or trachoma, both in adults and children. About 84 million worldwide develop C. trachomatis eye infections and 8 million are blinded as a result of the infection. Trachoma is the primary source of infectious blindness in some parts of rural Africa and Asia and is a neglected tropical disease that has been targeted by the World Health Organization for elimination by 2020. Inclusion conjunctivitis from C. trachomatis is responsible for about 19% of adult cases of conjunctivitis.

Treatment
Treatment depends on the infection site, age of the patient, and whether another infection is present. Having a C. trachomatis and one or more other sexually transmitted infections at the same time is possible. Treatment is often done with both partners simultaneously to prevent reinfection. C. trachomatis may be treated with several antibiotic medications, including azithromycin, erythromycin, ofloxacin, and tetracycline.

Tetracycline is the most preferred antibiotic to treat C.trachomatis and has the highest success rate. Azithromycin and doxycycline have equal efficacy to treat C. trachomatis with 97 and 98 percent success, respectively. Azithromycin is dosed as a 1 gram tablet that is taken by mouth as a single dose, primarily to help with concerns of non-adherence. Treatment with generic doxycycline 100  mg twice a day for 7 days has equal success with expensive delayed-release doxycycline 200 mg once a day for 7 days. Erythromycin is less preferred as it may cause gastrointestinal side effects, which can lead to non-adherence. Levofloxacin and ofloxacin are generally no better than azithromycin or doxycycline and are more expensive.

If treatment is necessary during pregnancy, levofloxacin, ofloxacin, tetracycline, and doxycycline are not prescribed. In the case of a patient who is pregnant, the medications typically prescribed are azithromycin, amoxicillin, and erythromycin. Azithromycin is the recommended medication and is taken as a 1 gram tablet taken by mouth as a single dose. Despite amoxicillin having fewer side effects than the other medications for treating antenatal C. trachomatis infection, there have been concerns that pregnant women who take penicillin-class antibiotics can develop a chronic persistent chlamydia infection. Tetracycline is not used because some children and even adults can not withstand the drug, causing harm to the mother and fetus. Retesting during pregnancy can be performed three weeks after treatment. If the risk of reinfection is high, screening can be repeated throughout pregnancy.

If the infection has progressed, ascending the reproductive tract and pelvic inflammatory disease develops, damage to the fallopian tubes may have already occurred. In most cases, the C. trachomatis infection is then treated on an outpatient basis with azithromycin or doxycycline. Treating the mother of an infant with C. trachomatis of the eye, which can evolve into pneumonia, is recommended. The recommended treatment consists of oral erythromycin base or ethylsuccinate 50 mg/kg/day divided into 4 doses daily for two weeks while monitoring for symptoms of infantile hypertrophic pyloric stenosis (IHPS) in infants less than 6 weeks old.

There have been a few reported cases of C.trachomatis strains that were resistant to multiple antibiotic treatments. However, as of 2018, this is not a major cause of concern as antibiotic resistance is rare in C.trachomatis compared to other infectious bacteria.

Laboratory tests

Chlamydia species are readily identified and distinguished from other Chlamydia species using DNA-based tests. Tests for Chlamydia can be ordered from a doctor, a lab or online.

Most strains of C. trachomatis are recognized by monoclonal antibodies (mAbs) to epitopes in the VS4 region of MOMP. However, these mAbs may also cross-react with two other Chlamydia species, C. suis and C. muridarum.
 Nucleic acid amplification tests (NAATs) tests find the genetic material (DNA) of Chlamydia bacteria. These tests are the most sensitive tests available, meaning they are very accurate and are very unlikely to have false-negative test results. A polymerase chain reaction (PCR) test is an example of a nucleic acid amplification test. This test can also be done on a urine sample, urethral swabs in men, or cervical or vaginal swabs in women.
 Nucleic acid hybridization tests (DNA probe test) also find Chlamydia DNA. A probe test is very accurate but is not as sensitive as NAATs.
 Enzyme-linked immunosorbent assay (ELISA, EIA) finds substances (Chlamydia antigens) that trigger the immune system to fight Chlamydia infection. Chlamydia Elementary body (EB)-ELISA could be used to stratify different stages of infection based upon Immunoglobulin-γ status of the infected individuals 
 Direct fluorescent antibody test also finds Chlamydia antigens.
 Chlamydia cell culture is a test in which the suspected Chlamydia sample is grown in a vial of cells. The pathogen infects the cells, and after a set incubation time (48 hours), the vials are stained and viewed on a fluorescent light microscope. Cell culture is more expensive and takes longer (two days) than the other tests. The culture must be grown in a laboratory.

Research
Due to its significance to human health, C. trachomatis is the subject of research in laboratories around the world. The bacteria are commonly grown in immortalised cell lines such as McCoy cells (see RPMI 1640) and HeLa cells. Infectious particles can be quantified by infecting cell layers and counting the number of inclusions, analogous to a plaque assay. Recent research has found that a pair of disulfide bond proteins, which are necessary for C. trachomatis to be able to infect host cells, is very similar to a homologous pair of proteins found in Escherichia coli (E. coli), though the reaction's speed is slower in C. trachomatis.

Other research has been conducted to try to get a feel for how to create a vaccine against C. trachomatis, finding that it would be very difficult to create a fully effective or even partially effective vaccine since the host's response to infection involves complex immunological pathways that must first be fully understood to ensure that adverse effects are avoided.

Vaccine
In August 2016 a Phase I, double-blind, parallel, randomized, placebo-controlled clinical trial was undertaken by the Danish Statens Serum Institut at Hammersmith Hospital in London, UK, in healthy women aged 19–45 years. The trial aimed to assess the safety and ability to provoke an immune response of the CTH522 chlamydia vaccine. 35 women not infected with chlamydia were included in the trial. The trial included two adjuvants and a saline control group. The vaccine was found to be safe, and all women who received the vaccine regardless of adjuvant developed an immune response against chlamydia.

The Serum Institute has announced that it will continue to pursue funding to move the vaccine into a Phase II trial.

History
C. trachomatis was first described in 1907 by Stanislaus von Prowazek and Ludwig Halberstädter in scrapings from trachoma cases. Thinking they had discovered a "mantled protozoan", they named the organism "Chlamydozoa" from the Greek "Chlamys" meaning mantle. Over the next several decades, "Chlamydozoa" was thought to be a virus as it was small enough to pass through bacterial filters and unable to grow on known laboratory media. However, in 1966 electron microscopy studies showed C. trachomatis to be a bacterium. This is essentially due to the fact that they were found to possess DNA, RNA, and ribosomes like other bacteria. It was originally believed that Chlamydia lacked peptidoglycan because researchers were unable to detect muramic acid in cell extracts. Subsequent studies determined that C. trachomatis synthesizes both muramic acid and peptidoglycan, but relegates it to the microbe's division septum and does not utilize it for construction of a cell wall. The bacterium is still classified as gram-negative

C. trachomatis agent was first cultured and isolated in the yolk sacs of eggs by Tang Fei-fan et al. in 1957. This was a significant milestone because it became possible to preserve these agents which could then be used for future genomic and phylogenetic studies. The isolation of C. trachomatis coined the term isolate to describe how C. trachomatis has been isolated from an in vivo setting into a "strain" in cell culture. Only a few "isolates" have been studied in detail, limiting the information that can be found on the evolutionary history of C. trachomatis.

Evolution 
In the 1990s it was shown that there are several species of Chlamydia. Chlamydia trachomatis was first described in historical records in Ebers papyrus written between 1553 and 1550 BC. In the ancient world, it was known as the blinding disease trachoma. The disease may have been closely linked with humans and likely predated civilization. It is now known that C. trachomatis comprises 19 serovars which are identified by monoclonal antibodies that react to epitopes on the major outer-membrane protein (MOMP). Comparison of amino acid sequences reveals that MOMP contains four variable segments: S1,2 ,3 and 4. Different variants of the gene that encodes for MOMP, differentiate the genotypes of the different serovars. The antigenic relatedness of the serovars reflects the homology levels of DNA between MOMP genes, especially within these segments.

Furthermore, there have been over 220 Chlamydia vaccine trials done on mice and other non-human host species to target C. muridarum and C. trachomatis strains. However, it has been difficult to translate these results to the human species due to physiological and anatomical differences. Future trials are working with closely related species to the human.

See also
 Translocated actin-recruiting phosphoprotein

References

Further reading

External links

 Chlamydiae.com
 
 Type strain of Chlamydia trachomatis at BacDive – the Bacterial Diversity Metadatabase
 Chlamydia symptoms with pictures

Chlamydiota
Sexually transmitted diseases and infections
Infectious causes of cancer
Infectious diseases with eradication efforts
Infections with a predominantly sexual mode of transmission
Bacteria described in 1935